Riston Rodrigues (born 11 October 1979) is an Indian former footballer who played as a midfielder, most recently for East Bengal in the I-League.

External links
 

Indian footballers
1979 births
Living people
I-League players
Vasco SC players
Churchill Brothers FC Goa players
Dempo SC players
Mumbai FC players
East Bengal Club players
Footballers from Goa
Association football midfielders